Rauceby may refer to:

North Rauceby, in Lincolnshire, England
South Rauceby, in Lincolnshire, England